Rig Cheshmeh (also Romanized as Rīg Cheshmeh) is a village in Qaleh Qafeh Rural District, in the Central District of Minudasht County, Golestan Province, Iran. At the 2006 census, its population was 110, in 32 families.

References 

Populated places in Minudasht County